The Malkin Athletic Center (MAC) is a 1,000-seat multi-purpose arena and athletic facility at Harvard University in Cambridge, Massachusetts.

Originally known as the Indoor Athletic Building (IAB), it is now named after Peter L. Malkin, who helped fund the refurbishment of the building in 1985.  It currently houses the Harvard Fencing Team, Harvard Crimson men's volleyball, Harvard Crimson women's volleyball, and Harvard Crimson wrestling teams. Each year, the Harvard Invitational Shoryuhai Intercollegiate Kendo Tournament, or Shoryuhai (昇龍杯 Shōryuhai) is held at the Malkin Athletic Center.  It also originally housed the Harvard Crimson men's basketball until they moved to the Lavietes Pavilion in 1982.

References

External links

 Malkin Athletic Center at GoCrimson.com

Harvard University
Defunct college basketball venues in the United States
College volleyball venues in the United States
Basketball venues in Massachusetts
Harvard Crimson basketball
Indoor arenas in Massachusetts
College wrestling venues in the United States
Fencing venues
Sports venues completed in 1930
1930 establishments in Massachusetts